Grenville was a federal electoral district represented in the House of Commons of Canada from 1904 to 1925. It was located in the province of Ontario. This riding was created in 1903 from parts of Grenville South and Leeds North and Grenville North ridings. It consisted of the county of Grenville.

The electoral district was abolished in 1924 when it was merged into Grenville—Dundas riding.

Election results

|}

|}

|}

On Mr. Reid being appointed Minister of Customs, 10 October 1911:

|}

|}

|}

On Mr. Casselman's acceptance of an office of emolument under the Crown, 27 December 1921:

|}

See also 

 List of Canadian federal electoral districts
 Past Canadian electoral districts

External links 
Riding history from the Library of Parliament

Former federal electoral districts of Ontario